Feras Fayyad (born September 20, 1984) is a  Syrian film director, producer, and writer. Fayyad best known for his 2017 documentary Last Men in Aleppo and his 2019 documentary The Cave, both films earned him critical acclaim and numerous awards and nominations including two Academy Award for Best Documentary Feature, making him the first Syrian director to be nominated for an Oscar. Fayyad also won an Emmy award for Best Current Affairs Documentary, was nominated for a creative Emmy for best writing and directing, and has received two George Foster Peabody awards and a nomination for Outstanding Directorial Achievement from the Directors Guild of America for his movie The Cave. 

Right from the beginning, his works dealt with the situation in his homeland Syria and the political shifts in the Arab world. His 2011 documentary "On the Other Side" (CZ). As a result, Fayyad was arrested in Damascus in late 2011, and he was subjected to extreme violence and torture during his two times imprisonment.

David France in The New York Times called Fayyad “ one of the most soulful documentary filmmakers working today” while Allen Johnson of San Francisco Chronicle wrote that "Fayyad is a humanitarian, and his approach in "The Cave" demonstrates that."

Fayyad and his team were not able to attend the 90th Academy Awards ceremony, as his visa was rejected in response to President Trump's Executive Order 13780.

As a result of making Last Men in Aleppo and The Cave, Fayyad became the subject of a vicious effort to discredit his work by pro-Putin, Russian hackers. In testimony in Koblenz's courtroom, He gives key testimony against a convicted war criminal officer who led a unit of Syria's General Intelligence Directorate and involved in Fayyad's torture as a result of his testimony he turned subject to an organized attack from a tabloid anti-migrants websites.

Early life
Fayyad was born in Dadikh, a Syrian village located in Saraqib Nahiyah in Idlib District, Idlib; he is the eldest of ten, seven sisters and two brothers. 
Fayyad spent his childhood between his village and Aleppo.

Personal life and torture

Arrest

When protests began against the Assad government, Fayyad grabbed his camera and went to the streets. He documented the early peaceful demonstrations, the arrests, the ruthless, violent government response, and the shooting of protesters in an attempt to quell the rebellion. He taught others to document the revolt until he was arrested in a policy of sweeping arrests.

Detention

Fayyad spent up to 18 months in his two times imprisonment, He was transferred between a number of detention center of the Syrian intelligence services facilities, Accused of spying and anti-regime activities; he was hung by his wrists for hours, beaten, lashed, and starved; kept in a filthy communal cell where it was hard to tell who was still alive. Fayyad was convinced he would die in prison. Even fellow inmates said he would not make it out alive.

Release

Fayyad was released without explanation, and his family urged him to leave the country, convinced he would not survive another arrest. He fled Syria soon after.
He fled to Turkey, then snuck back across the Syrian border to the besieged city of Aleppo to film Syrian civilians under bombardment, then to Europe But even then, his torture continued to haunt him, causing physical pain and reoccurring nightmares.

testimony on war crimes

Fayyad was the first victim to tell the Koblenz courtroom of the frankly unimaginable horror of Branch 251, “the Al-Khatib detention center” in Damascus, in the world's first case of its kind. The trial of two alleged torturers at the upper regional court, a German court in the western city of Koblenz. After a string of investigators, experts, and law enforcers, he is the first witness with personal experience of the torture rather than stories and reports.
In court, Fayyad declines to try to put into words the screams he had heard, but the director says via his interpreter: "One day I will try to describe it in my films."

Filmography
 Director 
 2013: Wide Shot-Close Shot (TV Movie documentary)  
 2013: Windows''' (TV Movie documentary)  
 2016: Between the Fighter in Syria (TV Series documentary)  
 2017: Last Men in Aleppo (Documentary) (directed by) 
 2019: The Cave Writer
 2013: Wide Shot-Close Shot (TV Movie documentary)  
 2013: Windows' (TV Movie documentary)  
 2016: Between the Fighter in Syria (TV Series documentary)  
 2017: Last Men in Aleppo (Documentary) (directed by) 
 2019: The Cave Producer
 2017: One Day in Aleppo (Short, producer) 
 Editor 
 2013: Train of Silence (Short) 
 2013: Untold Stories (Documentary)  
 2017: One Day in Aleppo (Short)  
 Other
 2013: Train of Silence (Short, Actor) 
 2013: Untold Stories (Documentary, art director)
 2013: Train of Silence (Short, composer)

Awards and nominations
 92nd Academy Awards - Academy Award for Best Documentary Feature
 90th Academy Awards - Academy Award for Best Documentary Feature
 2017 Sundance Film Festival - World Documentary Grand Jury Prize
 Independent Spirit Award for Best Documentary Feature
 2017 Peabody Award - Best Documentary 
 2017 Copenhagen International Documentary Festival - CPH:DOX Grand Prize for Best Documentary Feature
 2019 Toronto International Film Festival - People's Choice Award, Documentaries: The Cave 2020 Cinema for Peace Most Valuable Documentary of the Year Award: The Cave''

References

External links
 
Firas Fayyad disappearance in 2012 from his wife's perspective

1984 births
Living people
Syrian film producers
Syrian screenwriters
Syrian film directors
Syrian filmmakers